Szczebra ,, is a village in the administrative district of Gmina Nowinka, within Augustów County, Podlaskie Voivodeship, in north-eastern Poland.

The village has a population of 280.

References

Szczebra
Suwałki Governorate
Białystok Voivodeship (1919–1939)